Rajshahi is a metropolitan city and a major urban, commercial and educational centre of Bangladesh. It is also the administrative seat of the eponymous division and district.  Located on the north bank of the Padma River, near the Bangladesh-India border, the city has a population of over 763,580 residents. The town is surrounded by the satellite towns of Nowhata and Katakhali, which together build an urban agglomeration of about 1 million population.
Modern Rajshahi lies in the ancient region of Pundravardhana. The foundation of the city dates to 1634, according to epigraphic records at the mausoleum of Sufi saint Shah Makhdum. The area hosted a Dutch settlement in the 18th century. The Rajshahi municipality was constituted during the British Raj in 1876. It was a divisional capital of the Bengal Presidency.

Rajshahi is a significant administrative, educational, cultural, and business centre in Bangladesh. It is a historic center of silk production. Varendra Research Museum, the oldest of its kind in Bangladesh, is located in the city. The city is home to many renowned educational institutions of Bangladesh. The head office of Rajshahi Agricultural Development Bank and Barind Multipurpose Development Authority (BMDA) is situated in the city. The Shah Makhdum Airport serves Rajshahi. According to The Guardian it is the cleanest city in Bangladesh.

History
Rajshahi district was a part of the Pundra region of ancient Bengal ruled by the Pundra Kingdom.
Rajshahi was dominated by various Maharajas, Rajas and Zamindars. During Deo Rajas period, the region was known as Mohakalgarh. In 1288-89 the Raja was defeated by Shah Makhdum Rupos. The region came to be known as "Rampur Boalia" after establishment of administrative office in 1825. The origin of the present name of "Rajshahi" is debated among scholars. Most say that it takes its name from Hindu Kings Rajshahi Raj (or "Rajas") as Raj and the persianised Shahi'''; both of which mean "royal" or "kingdom". The administrative district was established in 1772 and the municipal corporation in 1876. 

During the British raj, it was also known as "Beuleah" and was the administrative headquarters of Rajshahi district in Eastern Bengal and Assam. It was originally chosen as a commercial factory for the silk trade, which was being officially encouraged by the agricultural department of that time. The town contained a government college, and an industrial school for sericulture. Most of the public buildings were severely damaged by the earthquake of 12 June 1897. Throughout much of the early part of the twentieth century there was a daily steamer service on the Ganges which connected it to rail-heads that led to the then provincial capital of Calcutta as well as other cities in the province of Bengal.

Rajshahi witnessed great atrocities by the Pakistan army in the 1962 Rajshahi massacres of Bangladeshis. During the Bangladesh Liberation War, Pakistan Army created an ad hoc Rajshahi brigade, deployed in September.

Rajshahi was made a city corporation in 1991.

Geography
Topography

The city is located on the alluvial plains of the Padma River, which runs through southern side of the city. It is bounded on the east, north and west by Paba Upazila (subdivision of a district) of the district.

Rajshahi district is bounded by Naogaon District to the north, Natore District to the east, and Chapai Nababganj District and the river Padma & Kushtia district to the south.

Climate
Under the Köppen climate classification, Rajshahi has a tropical wet and dry climate. The climate of Rajshahi is generally marked with monsoons, high temperature, considerable humidity and moderate rainfall. The hot season commences early in March and continues till the middle of July. The highest rainfall is observed during the months of monsoon.

Although once noted for its air pollution, since 2014 the levels of particulates have been dramatically reduced by various efforts to switch to cleaner fuels and to battery-powered vehicles, to pave earth streets, to encourage walking and bicycle transport, and to plant vegetation. The levels of PM10 dropped by 67% and PM2.5 which are particularly harmful to human health, dropped from 70 to 37 micrograms per cubic metre between 2014 and 2016.

Parks and greenery

Shaheed A.H.M Qamaruzzaman Central Park and Zoo is one of the popular public places of Rajshahi city. A wide area with green trees and grasses houses different animal species. It is located by the bank of the Padma River. Other parks in the city are Bhubon Mohon park and Captain Monsur Ali park. Shahid Zia children's park is specially designed for children's amusement. The bank of the Padma river along the city is also a destination for recreation. The bank is a planned zone in many parts of the city to accommodate city dwellers for recreation purposes. In 2015, Munsguard park near the old Dutch Boro Kuthi building and Lalonshah park near Shahmukhdum Eidgah was built bordering the bank to provide residents a place to enjoy the views of the Padma river.

Points of interest

 Banks of the Padma River: One of the largest rivers in South Asia. During the Monsoon season, the water level rises.
 Varendra Research Museum: Established in 1910, the museum is dedicated to ancient history and culture. It has a collection of artefacts relating to Hindu, Buddhist and Muslim heritage. Some of these date back to the 16th century. It is maintained by the University, located in the centre of town.
 Shrine of Shah Makhdum Rupos: A dargah (tomb) was established to mark the resting place of Shah Makhdum in 1635. He was the first preacher of Islam in the region. Legend has it that he arrived by riding down the Padma on two crocodiles. To preserve this myth, some crocodiles are kept in the pond next to the shrine.

 Shaheed A.H.M Qamaruzzaman Central Park and Zoo: The park is a wide area with trees and grass. The zoo houses a variety of animal species. It is located by the bank of river Padma.
 Shahid Zia Park: An amusement park, it has a mono rail and bumping cars. It is under the Rajshahi City Corporation.
 University of Rajshahi: This campus is within a few kilometres from the city centre. Second largest university in Bangladesh.
 Shaheb Bazar: This is the centre of the city, where most of the shopping malls and commercial buildings are located.
 Ghoramara: The oldest part of Rajshahi City, consisting most of the oldest (70 to 100 years old) buildings.
 Boro Kuthi: In the compound of the Barakuthi there is a small cemetery with groves dating back to the nineteenth century. There are 14 tombs with thirteen epitaphs within the cemetery.
 Upashohor: This is a planned model town. Rajshahi Cantonment is located beside this area.
 Motihar: Rajshahi University is situated in this area on a large campus surrounded by mango groves.
 Kashia-Danga: From this area a massive mango tree garden area of Rajshahi starts. It is in the west part of the city, near to Rajshahi court railway station.
 Santal Para: Located inside the Mahish-Bathan Area. Some Santal tribes people live here.
 Bangabandhu Novo Theatre, Rajshahi: Establishment of Bangabandhu Sheikh Mujibur Rahman Novo Theatre, Rajshahi is being implemented.

Administration

Rajshahi is the headquarter of one of the eight administrative divisions of Bangladesh. Divisional Commissioner, who is the administrative chief of Rajshahi Division, DIG for Rajshahi division and other divisional civil servants have their own offices in the city, which functions as part of the government administrative setup. Deputy Commissioner (DC) who is the administrative chief of Rajshahi District, Civil Surgeon and other district level civil servants have their offices in the city. District judges as well as Metropolitan magistrates have their offices within the city.

Rajshahi is one of seven metropolitan cities in Bangladesh. One mayor and 30 ward commissioners are elected for five-year terms by direct votes. Rajshahi City Corporation is responsible for all the administrative work related to city governance under its jurisdiction.

Rajshahi Metropolitan Police (RMP), headed by a Commissioner, controls law and order as well as traffic movements within the metropolitan area.

Rajshahi Unnayan Kortripokhkho/Rajshahi Development Authority (RDA) plans and coordinates the development related works within metropolitan area. Rajshahi WASA is responsible for water supply and drainage system within city area.

 Economy 

Rajshahi has been famous for its silk textiles since the British period. There are also several jute mills in Rajshahi. At present many glass making factories have been set up in Rajshahi. Rajshahi City Corporation has constructed BSIC. Industrial City-02 in Paba Upazila of Rajshahi. And work is underway on a leather industry area. There will also be a 1,200-acre industrial zone under the Bangladesh Economic Zone (BEPZA). Bangabandhu Hi-Tech Park will play an important role in the development of IT in Rajshahi. When completed, it will revolutionize information and communication technology in the region, which will employ about 50,000 people.

There is also a char on the banks of the river Padma near the city of Rajshahi. Rajshahi City Corporation has plans to build another economic zone on the char. When the construction of the char is completed, it will become the commercial center of North Bengal

Culture
Arts and festivals

Rajshahi is famous for Rajshahi silk, which has a special status as clothing material in Indian subcontinent. Rajshahi is the home of the region's best mangoes and lichis. Rajshahi is also the location of Barendra Museum, which is known for its collection of local sculpture and other artifacts dating from medieval times. It also has some important structures made by the British like the T Dam.Pohela Baishakh, the Bengali New Year, and Pahela Falgun, the first day of spring of the Bengali month Falgun, in the Bengali calendar, is celebrated in the city in a festive manner. There are widespread celebration of Muslim festivals of Eid ul-Fitr, Eid ul-Adha, and Muharram; Hindu festivals of Durga Puja, Buddhist festival of Buddha Purnima; and the Christian festival of Christmas across the city.

Media
There are many Bengali daily newspapers published from the city, including Sonali Sangbad, Sunshine, Dainik Barta, Sonar Desh, Natun Provat, and Amader Rajshahi. There are also many online news portal such as Uttarkal, Padmatimes24, rajshahinews24.com, silkcitynews.com, and others.

The government-run Bangladesh Television and Bangladesh Betar have transmission centres in Rajshahi.

A local FM radio station, Radio Padma, transmits at 99.2 MHz frequency and Radio Foorti transmits at 88.0 MHz.

There is also five pressclub in Rajshahi City.Known as Rajshahi City Press Club, Rajshahi Press Club, Rajshahi Metropolitan Press Club, Rajshahi Varendra Press Club and Rajshahi Model Press Club.

Sports

There are three 15,000+ capacity stadium in the city. One at the centre of the city which is normally called the Rajshahi District Stadium, another is inside the Rajshahi University and the last one basically used for cricket is located at Terokhadia called Shaheed Qamaruzzaman Stadium. There is also an international standard tennis complex and few sports training academy in the city.

Many national level footballers groomed in the city such as former Bangladesh national team captain Mohammed Mohsin and recently midfielder Manik Hossain Molla. The city is the home of several national level club teams like Digonto Proshari and Sonali Otit. There are also a few football training academies including one in the Rajshahi's central eidgah (large open ground used on special occasions for Muslim prayers) and in the Zilla stadium.

The city is an important place for cricket in Bangladesh. As regular supplier of cricketer in the national team, it is also the home of Bangladesh Premier League team Rajshahi Kings. The city has two cricket academies Banglatrack and Clemon, to grow and train upcoming cricketers.

Rajshahi is also known for hockey. There are many local hockey practice clubs that give opportunity to play in national, inter-university, college, and school levels. There are National Team hockey players from Rajshahi. Late Mintu was one of them and by his name there is "Mintu Chottor" at lokkhipur mor, Rajshahi.

Transport

Road
Rajshahi is connected to most other parts of the country via the N6 national highway. There are two intercity bus terminal in the city. It takes about 5 to 6 hours by road to reach the capital city Dhaka. A number of bus services, including air-conditioned and non-air conditioned buses, are available to and from Dhaka. Bus services to other major cities and districts headquarter are also available from Rajshahi.

Railway
Four inter-city train services are operated by Bangladesh Railway, named Silk City Express, Padma Express and Dhumketu Express, and Bonolota Express between Dhaka and Rajshahi railway station regularly. There are other inter-city, mail and local trains operated from Rajshahi to Khulna and other regions of the country.

Air
The city is served by Shah Makhdum Airport, named after the Islamic preacher Shah Makhdum Rupos, situated at Nowhata, a commuter town of the city. Biman Bangladesh Airlines, Novoair, and US-Bangla Airlines operate domestic flights to and from Dhaka.

Public transport
Cycle rickshaws and auto rickshaws are the main mode of transport within the city and metro area. Once there were plenty of Tomtom (horse driven cart) in the city, which are still found, but fewer in numbers. There are bus and minibus services in a limited number of routes, connecting suburban areas of the city. Plenty of rental car agencies operate within the city and metro area, where sedans, SUVs, and micro-buses are available to hire on an hourly or daily basis. Ride sharing services like Uber and Obhai'' also available in the city.

Healthcare
The city has many government, private and NGO run hospitals. Rajshahi Medical College Hospital (RMCH) is a tertiary level public hospital with a teaching facility in graduate and postgraduate medical education. There are two private medical college hospitals, and another two are under construction in the city. There are also a government run children's hospital, one chest hospital, a district level government hospital and a Christian missionary hospital within the city area.

Demographics

At the time of the 2011 census, Rajshahi had a population of 449,756 in 99,545 households. Rajshahi has a sex ratio of 930 females per 1000 males and a literacy rate of 74.1%.

Bengali is the main language for the citizens of the city. Many distinctive Bengali dialects and regional languages are also spoken. There is a minority Urdu-speaking population, who are descendants of displaced Muslims from the eastern part of British India who sought refuge during separation of India and Pakistan in 1947.

Education 

Rajshahi, commonly referred to as Education City, is home to many government and private educational institutions. The city is home to the Rajshahi College- which is the third oldest college in Bangladesh after Dhaka College, and Chittagong College, Rajshahi Medical College, the second oldest medical college in erstwhile East Pakistan. The University of Rajshahi is the second oldest and one of the largest public universities in the country. Rajshahi Engineering College, now known as RUET, was the second engineering college established in the then East Pakistan in 1964.

Major educational institutes include:

 University of Rajshahi(RU)
 Rajshahi University of Engineering and Technology(RUET)
 Rajshahi Medical College(RMC)
 Rajshahi College(RC)
 Rajshahi Government City College(RGCC)
 New Government Degree College, Rajshahi(NGDC)
 Rajshahi Cadet College(RCC)
 Rajshahi Shikkha Board Government Model School & College
 Rajshahi Cantonment Public School & College
 Rajshahi Collegiate School
 Govt. Promoth Nath Girls' High School, Rajshahi 
 Rajshahi Govt. Girls' High School, Helenabad
 Rajshahi Government Model School & College
 Rajshahi Mohila Polytechnic Institute
 Rajshahi Polytechnic Institute
 Government Women's College, Rajshahi
 Barind Medical College
 Seroil Government High School, Rajshahi
 Government Laboratory High School Rajshahi
 Rajshahi University School
 Haji Abul Hossain Institute of Technology, Rajshahi
 Higher Secondary Teacher's Training Institute
 Haji Muhammad Mohsin Government High School
 Islami Bank Medical College
 Mohanogor College, Rajshahi
 North Bengal International University
 Nowhata Govt. Degree College, Nowhata, Rajshshi
 Shah Mokhdum College
 Shah Mokhdum Medical College
 Silk Research and Training Institute
Shahid A.H.M Kamruzzaman Government Degree College
 Teacher's Training College
 Udayan Dental College
 Varendra Government College, Rajshahi
 Varendra University

Notable residents
 A.H.M. Quamruzzaman, politician
 Amir Ali, MLA, Politician and Zamindar
 Ataur Rahman, Politician and former Governor
 Ritwik Ghatak, filmmaker
 Hasan Azizul Huq, linguist
 Fazle Hossain Badsha, Politician
 Selina Hossain, novelist
 Andrew Kishore, singer
 Rajanikanta Sen, Poet
 Akshay Kumar Maitreya, historian
 A. H. M. Khairuzzaman Liton, Politician
 Khaled Mashud, cricketer
 Ila Mitra, activist
 Sabbir Rahman, cricketer
 Sir Jadunath Sarkar, historian
 Mohammad Shamsuzzoha, academic
 Junaid Siddique, cricketer
 Najmul Hossain Shanto, cricketer
 Enamul Karim Nirjhar, architect
 Mizanur Rahman Minu, Politician
 Mahiya Mahi, Actress
 Malay Bhowmick, Playwright and director
 Shahriar Alam, politician
 Mrinal Haque, sculptor

Twin towns and sister cities
Rajshahi's twin town and sister city is:
  Kristiansand, Norway (1979)

See also 
 List of cities and towns in Bangladesh
 Rajshahi University of Engineering & Technology
 Rajshahi University

References

Notes

External links

 Map of Rajshahi District
 E-Rajshahi (in English), an online portal for information and government services managed by Rajshahi City Corporation
 FinancialExpress-bd.com, News about LSE survey
 Betar.org.be, Radio Bangladesh website for information on Bangladesh Betar
 World-Airport-Codes.com, information on Shah Mokhdum Airport
 Uttorbongo Protidin, a popular online Newspaper from Rajshahi.

 
Populated places in Rajshahi Division
Cities in Bangladesh